MNHM stands for:
National Museum of Military History (Luxembourg), from its French name Musée National d'Histoire Militaire
Morrison Natural History Museum in Colorado, United States